Tomotaka is a masculine Japanese given name.

Possible writings
Tomotaka can be written using many different combinations of kanji characters. Some examples:

友隆, "friend, noble"
友孝, "friend, filial piety"
友貴, "friend, precious"
友崇, "friend, respect"
友喬, "friend, high"
友高, "friend, tall"
友昂, "friend, rise"
友豪, "friend, overpowering"
知隆, "know, noble"
知孝, "know, filial piety"
知貴, "know, precious"
知崇, "know, respect"
知喬, "know, high"
智隆, "intellect, noble"
智孝, "intellect, filial piety"
智貴, "intellect, precious"
共隆, "together, noble"
共孝, "together, filial piety"
朋隆, "companion, noble"
朋孝, "companion, filial piety"
朝隆, "morning/dynasty, noble"
朝孝, "morning/dynasty, filial piety"
朝貴, "morning/dynasty, precious"
朝崇, "morning/dynasty, respect"

The name can also be written in hiragana ともたか or katakana トモタカ.

Notable people with the name
, Australian-born Japanese squash player
, Japanese footballer
, Japanese musician
, Japanese footballer
, Japanese baseballer 
, Japanese roboticist
, Japanese film director

Japanese masculine given names